Young is a town in the South West Slopes region of New South Wales, Australia and the largest town in the Hilltops Region. The "Lambing Flat" Post Office opened on 1 March 1861 and was renamed "Young" in 1863.

Young is marketed as the Cherry Capital of Australia and every year hosts the National Cherry Festival. Young is situated on the Olympic Highway and is approximately 2 hours drive from the Canberra area. It is in a valley, with surrounding hills. The town is named after Sir John Young, the governor of NSW from 1861 to 1867.

History

Before European settlers arrived in Young, members of the Burrowmunditory tribe, a family group of the indigenous Wiradjuri Nation, lived in the region. Descendants of the Burrowmunditory clan still live in Young.

His story is told in the novel Brothers in Exile. 

In late June 1860 Michael Sheedy from Binalong, and a group of other stockmen, were on James White's 'Burrangong' pastoral run looking for horses. The sheltered area known as 'Lambing Flat' lay along a creek between heavily timbered hills. Stock yards had been built there and used to enclose strayed and wild horses from the surrounding country. The cook for the party, an American, "who was familiar with the appearance of many other goldfields, was struck with the appearance of the place". The cook washed several spadefuls of earth "and succeeded in getting a good prospect of gold". After procuring the horses the men returned to Binalong, 32 miles to the south-east, and after a few days Sheedy and six men returned with tools and provisions, "determined to test the auriferous quality of the place". The second dishful washed by the men produced a nugget of seven pennyweight. By late July 1860 word had spread and there were about fifty persons at Lambing Flat who had joined the search for gold. 

From November 1860 through to June 1861, anti-Chinese miners attacked Chinese gold miners in the area, now known as the infamous Lambing Flat riots. As gold became scarce, European miners began to resent what they saw as the greater success of the more industrious Chinese, and hence many Chinese miners were attacked, robbed and killed. The anti-Chinese rebels rallied in numbers of up to 3,000. Eventually the rioters were controlled, Chinese miners had their claims restored to them, but the New South Wales Parliament passed the Chinese Immigration Bill which restricted the number of Chinese that could be brought into New South Wales on any ship and imposed a tax per head on entry.

The town of Young was gazetted in 1861. The goldfields produced  of gold sent by escort from the fields. Up to 20,000 miners worked the fields including about 2,000 Chinese miners.

Later in the 1860s, some Chinese, who remained in the district, ran intensive and successful market gardens, supplying Young and other towns, even as far away as Wagga. 

The town was incorporated in 1882, with miller, Peter Cram, the first mayor.

In 1889 Young was the first town in Australia to install electricity into the streets and homes of the township; Tamworth NSW had installed electricity to the streets only the previous year.

The former Young Shire was acknowledged as the first Local Government Area to institute a rural school bus system in New South Wales.

Heritage listings
Young has a number of heritage-listed sites, including:
 Blayney-Harden railway: Young railway station
 Lynch Street: City Bank building
 Whiteman Avenue: Blackguard Gully

Climate
Owing to Young's far western location, it features hot, dry summers and cool, damp winters making for a particularly wide seasonal range characteristic of the South West Slopes region. Snow falls occasionally; notwithstanding its low elevation of just , as it lay far west enough to bear the brunt of the prevailing westerly cloudbands.

Demographics

The breakdown of population in 2016 in the township included 367 people (5.1%) (197 males and 172 females) who identified as being of Indigenous origin. The median age of people was 40 years.

The number of people born overseas in the 2016 Census was 1023 (13.9%) compared with 650 (5.8%) in the 2001 Census, 589 (5.3%) in the 1996 Census and 549 (5.1%) in the 1991 Census. Of those born overseas, the three main countries of birth in the 2016 Census were:
 England: 95 (1.3%)
 New Zealand: 47 (0.7%) and;
 Lebanon: 37 (0.5%).

In the 2016 Census, the three most common ancestries identified with were:

 Australian: 3405 people (35.8%)
 English: 2957 people (31.1%) and;
 Irish: 1045 people (11.0%).

English was stated as the only language spoken at home by 6,413 people (89.6%) in the 2016 Census. The three most common languages spoken at home other than English in the 2016 Census were:

Arabic (including Lebanese): 88 (1.2%)
Tagalog: 22 (0.3%) and;
Mandarin: 22 (0.3%).

In the week preceding the 2016 Census, 1894 households (67.8%) had accessed the internet at home. 501 (8.9%) people held a bachelor's degree or above. 212 people were unemployed, representing 7.6% of the labour force. The median weekly individual income for people aged 15 years and over in the 2016 Census was $505. In the 2016 Census, there were 2,324 separate houses (83.2%), 202 semi-detached, row or terrace houses and townhouses (7.2%), 257 flats, units or apartments (9.2%) and 3 other dwellings (0.1%). In the 2016 Census, there were 594 couple families with children (which comprised 34.4% of all families in occupied private dwellings), 675 couple families without children (39.1%), 431 one parent families (24.9%) and 28 other families (1.6%).

The Lambing Flat Chinese Tribute Gardens

The gardens are intended to create an ambience similar to the Japanese Gardens at Cowra. Chinamans Dam, with an initial capacity of over  when it was in railway use, is situated at a hamlet called Pitstone on Sawpit Gully. The dam was built in the 1860s by German brothers (from Hannover), Herman and John Tiedemann, to provide water for the sluicing of their Victoria Hill gold claims. At some time in the 1870s, the brothers sold the area, including the dam, to a Chinese group who worked the site.

The dam was used as a railway facility from 1882 when the NSW Railway Commissioners gave notice of the intention to build the first part of the Blayney-Demondrille railway. To provide water for its steam locomotives, the Commissioners decided to provide a dam and pump water from it to a facility, known as Young Tank, at the  post. It is not known whether the railways enhanced the existing dam or built a new facility.

From 1885 to 1901, locomotives stopped at Young Tank to replenish their water. In 1901, watering facilities were built at Young Station. The supply of water was obtained from Chinamans Dam. The capacity of the dam was enlarged in 1911. The dam was a popular spot for swimming and, whilst officially frowned upon, was tolerated.

Following the connection to the South West Tablelands Water Supply Scheme, which provided water from Burrinjuck Dam, the railways ceased to draw water from Chinamans Dam after 1936. The site was returned to the Crown in 1962 and in the following year, a  reserve was established and the Shire Council were appointed as trustees. The dam has since been enlarged.

Education
Young has six schools:
St Mary's Primary School
New Madinah College
Young North Primary School
Young Public School
Hennessy Catholic College
Young High School

Sport
Rugby football is traditionally popular in Young, with a strong Maher Cup rugby league team competing between 1920 and 1971. Australian rules football was also at times popular in Young, with the Young Saints experiencing success in the Central West AFL in the 1980s, however despite attempts to revive it as a junior club, folded in 2018.

The following sports teams operate out of Young:
 Young Cherrypickers are a rugby league team playing in the Group 9 competition
 Burrangong Bears are a rugby league team playing in the Mid West Cup competition
 Young Yabbies is a rugby union team playing in the Southern Inland Rugby Union competition.
 Young Lions is a soccer club fielding teams that play in the Bathurst District Soccer Senior Men's and Senior Women's competition.

Media

Newspapers
Burrangong Argus 1864–1914 (incorporated in The Young Witness)
Burrangong Chronicle 1873–1902 (became the Young Chronicle)
Burrangong Courier 1962 (ceased publication)
The Lambing Flat Miner 1862–1961 (ceased publication)
Young Chronicle 1902–1947 (incorporated in The Young Witness)
The Young Witness 1909–

Radio stations
ABC Classic FM 88.3
ABC Radio National 89.1/97.1
ABC Riverina 89.9/96.3
Roccy FM 93.9 (commercial)
SBS Radio FM 98.7 (retransmission)
triple j 90.7
2LF AM 1350 (commercial)
2YYY (community radio)

Churches 

 Kingdom Hall of Jehovah's Witnesses, Wombat Street
 New Life Community Church – McDonnels Road
 St John's Anglican Church – cnr Cloete and Zouch Streets
 St Mary's Roman Catholic Church – Ripon Street
 St Paul's Presbyterian Church – cnr Lynch and Lovell Streets
 Young Baptist Church – Nasmyth Street
 Young Mosque (Lebanese Muslim Association) – Moppity Road 
 Young Seventh-Day Adventist Church – Wombat Street
 Young Uniting Church – cnr Lynch and Cloete Streets

Notable people

Charles Anderson  (1897–1988), a Member of Parliament
Donald Chalmers , Chief of Navy from 1997 to 1999
Thomas Collins (1884–1945), a Member of Parliament
Rose Ann Creal, matron, recipient of the Royal Red Cross (First Class)
Peter Cusack, a rugby league footballer
Libby Gleeson, a children's author
Bert Hopkins, an Australian cricketer
Ron Lynch, a rugby league footballer and coach
Nathan Lyon, an Australian cricketer
Roger McDonald, an author
Brendon Reeves, a rugby league player
Kerry Saxby-Junna, double Commonwealth Games gold medal racewalker
James Schiller, a rugby league player
Isaac Smith, AFL footballer

References

External links

 Hilltops Council
 Visit Young & Hilltops Region Tourism Website

 
Towns in New South Wales
1826 establishments in Australia
Mining towns in New South Wales